The San Esteban was a  galleon in the Spanish navy that was wrecked in a storm off the coast of France in 1607.

The San Esteban was a 549-ton galleon of the Spanish navy.
She belonged to the Spanish squadron of Viscaye (Biscay), responsible for the coastal defenses of the north of Spain.
She served for 34 months from March 1604 to January 1607.

In the company of eight other vessels traveling from Lisbon to Pasaia, Basque Country, the San Esteban was caught in a storm and drifted onto shore near the bar of Bidart, France. She foundered on 4 January 1607.

References
Citations

Sources

Age of Sail merchant ships of Spain
17th-century ships
Shipwrecks in the Bay of Biscay